James Edward Lascelles (born 5 October 1953) is a British musician and the second son of the 7th Earl of Harewood and his first wife, Marion. Lascelles is a second cousin to King Charles III.

Music
When young, Lascelles had classical piano and drum lessons, and claims that "John Tavener 'taught' him to improvise" by performing duets on a church organ.

He then became interested in jazz, blues, and rock and roll.

Global Village Trucking Company
Lascelles was a co-founder of the Global Village Trucking Company, known to its fans as "The Globs", in the early 1970s.  The band, the road crew and their families all lived together in a commune in an old farmhouse in Sotherton, Suffolk, and undertook numerous benefit concerts and free festivals, playing extended free-form jams, making them a well known UK live act.  The band shunned record companies, but played on the Greasy Truckers Live at Dingwalls Dance Hall benefit album at Dingwalls in 1973, and in November 1974 they recorded an eponymous album at Rockfield Studios, Monmouth, Wales.

In 1973 the BBC made a documentary about Global Village Trucking Company, their communal living and their aim to make it without a record company. The BBC updated the documentary for the What Happened Next series, shown in May 2008, which included their first gig in 30 years. This re-union led to other Global Village gigs at Glastonbury 2008 and other festivals.

Later career
Lascelles then became a session musician, until in 1980 he joined The Breakfast Band, a jazz/funk band, which released two albums, Dolphin Ride and Waters Edge, and had a dance hit, "L.A. 14".

He then took an interest in world music, recording tribal music in North Africa and New Mexico, and releasing this on his own label, Tribal Music International. He also started composing music for theatre, The Footsbarn Travelling Theatre Company and Tiata Fahodzi, and film. He now plays keyboards, for Cockney Rebel and his own world music band, Talking Spirit, and works with disaffected inner-city children.
As of 2011 Lascelles was appearing with Mike Storey as "The Ivory Brothers".

Personal life
Lascelles has been married three times. First, on 4 April 1973 in Wortham, to Frederica Ann Duhrssen (born 12 June 1954, Newport, Maine). They had two children before divorcing in 1985:
 Sophie Lascelles (born 1 October 1973, Thorpeness, Suffolk) married 11 June 2011 at Luton Hoo to Timothy Pearce. They had a daughter, Lilianda, in 2010 before their marriage.
 Rowan Nash Lascelles (born 6 November 1977, Sotherton, Suffolk)

Secondly, on 4 May 1985 in Albuquerque, New Mexico, to Lori "Shadow" Susan Lee (29 August 1954, Albuquerque – 29 June 2001). They had two children:
 Tanit Lascelles (born 1 July 1981, Santa Eulària des Riu, Spain)
 Tewa Ziyane Robert George Lascelles (born 8 June 1985, Edgewood, New Mexico) has been married to Cynthia Lascelles, née Ramirez, since 2008. They had a son, Fran,  in 2014.
James and Lori divorced in 1996.
  
Thirdly, Lascelles married Joy Elias-Rilwan (born 15 June 1954, Nigeria), on 30 January 1999. The Hon. Mrs. Lascelles is an actress and is actively involved in efforts to combat AIDS. She has four children of her own, and is a member of the Elias family of Yoruba chieftains in Lagos.

Lascelles' younger brother Jeremy Lascelles is a prominent British music industry executive, who played percussion for the Global Village Trucking Company.

Discography
Global Village Trucking Company 
 Greasy Truckers Live at Dingwalls Dance Hall (1974)
 Global Village Trucking Company (1975) (Caroline 1516) (Allmusic rating )

The Breakfast Band
 Dolphin Ride
 Waters Edge

Solo
Turn off the Lights (2004) (Large 3)

Mandyleigh Storm
 Fire & Snow (2008)

Notes and sources

External links
James Lascelles' website

1953 births
Living people
British people of Austrian-Jewish descent
English rock keyboardists
James
Steve Harley & Cockney Rebel members
Younger sons of earls